This is a list of soy-based foods. The soybean is a species of legume native to East Asia, widely grown for its edible bean which has numerous uses.  The plant is classed as an oilseed rather than a pulse by the UN Food and Agriculture Organization (FAO). Many foods and dishes are prepared using soybeans as a primary ingredient.

Soy-based foods

 
 
 Doenjang – Fermented soybean paste

Dishes

Product brands

  – a brand of soy milk

See also

 List of fermented soy products
 List of legume dishes
 List of meat substitutes
 List of tofu dishes
 Lists of prepared foods
 List of vegetable dishes
 Soy milk maker

References

 
Soy-based